Barbara Anelka Tausia (born 8 July 1977) is a Belgian choreographer and dancer. She is the wife of French footballer Nicolas Anelka and has followed her husband around Europe as he has changed teams.

Biography

Career
Barbara Tausia began her dance and music career as a vocal artist with the French hip hop singer MC Solaar, singing on the song "La La, La La" on his album Cinquième As. In 2003 she was named as the singer of the Italian dance band Eu4ya, releasing a cover of Ricchi e Poveri's Sarà perchè ti amo, following it up in 2004 with a cover of the Steam song "Na Na Hey Hey Kiss Him Goodbye". She is also a dancer on a popular French TV show.

Company
In 2006 she founded the event and Public Relations company with her business partner Between in Paris. Between agency has several clients such as Adidas, Quick, Sony Ericsson, Reebok, Paris Saint Germain F.C., and American celebrities such as P. Diddy, Jay-Z and Timbaland. Between also takes care of Nicolas Anelka's press and public relations.

Discography

Singles

with Eu4ya
 2003: "Sarà perchè ti amo"
 2004: "Na Na Hey Hey Kiss Him Goodbye"

with MC Solaar
 2001: "La La, La La"

Personal life
She was raised with her family in Belgium and then moved to Paris for her dance career; there she met Nicolas Anelka. They married on 9 June 2007 in Marrakesh, Morocco.

References

External links
 Discogs Profile

1977 births
Living people
Eurodance musicians
Dutch-language singers of Belgium
English-language singers from Belgium
French-language singers of Belgium
People from Charleroi
Belgian people of Italian descent
Association footballers' wives and girlfriends
21st-century Belgian women singers
21st-century Belgian singers